Rituals is the second studio album by British electropop band Fenech-Soler. It was released on 25 September 2013 by Warner Bros. Records and B-Unique Records, it is the major label debut of Fenech-Soler, whose previous record was released under the London-based B-Unique Records. The album is a follow-up to the band's 2012–13 singles "All I Know", "Magnetic" and "Last Forever", all of which feature on the album.

A special edition of the album with a new track listing was released a year later on 25 August 2014 and replaced the band's first full-length US release, (which subsequently was deleted from online services). It features four tracks from their previous self-titled debut studio album.

Packaging
The artwork for Rituals features a photograph taken by South African professional photographer Andrew McGibbon. The photograph, entitled Stars Bow, features a horse named Star, lit in Strobe lighting, taking a "bow" in front of the camera. The photograph is part of a series of photographs taken by McGibbon as a collection entitled All the Wild Horses, which was originally released online in April 2012.  The artist statement for the work states:

"For thousands of years the horse has been mankind's closest ally. The horse made travel and development possible. We tethered, weighted and reigned them. We captured, stabled and trained them.

Ever willing, the horse was the magnificent tool of man’s ingenuity. The horse is a beast of legend, taking on its own character, personality, emotion and mythology.

However, with the advent of the steam engine the horse was made obsolete, and now they are resigned to the realm of shows and races, a world of equestrian sport, a mere shadow of the beast’s former glory.

All the Wild Horses is a tribute to the beast that has made much of what we call life possible. The images are unique and have a style to them reminiscent of the portraiture of the rich and famous. The artist has attempted, and succeeded, to show a sense of personality and emotion – sadness in some cases and pride in others.

Painstakingly lit, this body of work is about the horse itself to which we all feel a connection, whether it's obvious or deep down in our collective subconscious. There is a sense of awe that this beast inspires in each and everyone of us".

"All the wild horses, tethered with tears in their eyes. May no man's touch ever tame you, may no man's reigns ever chain you. And may no man's weight ever lay freight your soul" – Ray Lamontagne.

Track listing

Personnel
Adapted from Rituals liner notes.

Fenech-Soler
Ben Duffy – lead vocals
Ross Duffy – guitar
Daniel Soler – bass, keyboard
Andrew Lindsay – percussion

Additional musicians
Dominic Greensmith – percussion 
Linus Eklöw – additional instruments 
Svidden – additional instruments 

Technical production
Dan Grech-Marguerat – mixing 
Duncan Fuller – assistant mixing 
Wez Clarke – mixing 
Neil Comber – mixing 
John Davis – mastering 
Stuart Hawkes – mastering 
Bruno Ellingham – engineer 

Artwork
Non-Format – art direction, design
Andrew McGibbon – album artwork, Stars Bow
Jenna Foxton – photography

Release history

References

2013 albums
Fenech-Soler albums
Warner Records albums